Morbagh (also Romanized as Morbāgh; also known as Marbakh and Morbakh) is a village in Moqam Rural District, Shibkaveh District, Bandar Lengeh County, Hormozgan Province, Iran. At the 2006 census, its population was 543, in 97 families.

References 
Citations

Sources
1. کامله،القاسمی،  بنت شیخ عبدالله، (تاریخ لنجة)  مکتبة دبي للتوزیع، الامارات: الطبعة الثانية عام ۱۹۹۳ للمیلاد
2 . الوحیدی الخنجی، حسین بن علی بن احمد،  «تاریخ لنجه» ، الطبعة الثانية دبی: دار الأمة للنشر والتوزیع، ۱۹۸۸ للمیلاد
3. اطلس گیتاشناسی استان‌های ایران [Atlas Gitashenasi Ostanhai Iran] (Gitashenasi Province Atlas of Iran)

Populated places in Bandar Lengeh County